Grand Duchess Olga of Russia may refer to:

Grand Duchesses of Russia by birth
Grand Duchess Olga Pavlovna of Russia (1792–1795), fifth daughter of Paul I of Russia
Olga Nikolaevna of Russia (1822–1892), second daughter of Nicholas I of Russia; wife of Charles I of Württemberg
Olga Constantinovna of Russia (1851–1926), eldest daughter of Grand Duke Constantine of Russia; wife of George I of Greece
Grand Duchess Olga Alexandrovna of Russia (1882–1960), daughter of Alexander III of Russia; wife of Peter of Oldenburg & Nicholas Kulikovsky
Grand Duchess Olga Nikolaevna of Russia (1895–1918), eldest daughter of Nicholas II of Russia and Alix of Hesse and by Rhine